The 1933 Open Championship was the 68th Open Championship, held 5–8 July at the Old Course in St Andrews, Scotland. Denny Shute defeated fellow American Craig Wood by five strokes in a  Saturday playoff to win his only Open title, the first of his three major championships. The Ryder Cup was held in late June at Southport and Ainsdale Golf Club in North West England, and the members of the American team played in the championship, similar to four years later in 1937.

Qualifying took place on 3–4 July, Monday and Tuesday, with 18 holes on the Old Course and 18 holes on the New Course, and the top 100 and ties qualified. Willie Nolan led the qualifiers with 138; the qualifying score was 158 and 117 players qualified. The leading 60 players and ties after 36 holes made the cut to play on the final day. Walter Hagen led after each of the first two rounds and scores of 152 (+6) and better made the cut.

In pursuit of his twelfth major title, Hagen opened with 68 to take the lead on  He held on to it after 36 holes at 140 on Thursday, but then carded 161 (+15) in the final two rounds and fell out of the top twenty.

A group of four players shared the 54-hole lead at 216 (–3) at midday on Friday: Henry Cotton, Abe Mitchell, Syd Easterbrook, and Leo Diegel. Wood began the final round a stroke behind, while Shute was three back at even par. The final round was a disaster for the leaders as Easterbrook shot 77 (+4), while Cotton and Mitchell both carded 79 (+6). Shute and Wood tied for the clubhouse lead with rounds of 73 and 75, respectively. Diegel found the 18th green in two and needed only a two-putt to join the playoff. He left his first putt short, then completely missed the ball on his second attempt. The untimely mistake caused him to miss out on the playoff by a single stroke, as did American Gene Sarazen. In the final round Wood managed to hit a  drive at the 5th, but he found a bunker and lost a stroke on the hole.

During the playoff, Wood opened with a pair of sixes and was four strokes down after two holes. Shute prevailed over Wood in the 36-hole playoff by five shots. Wood lost playoffs at all four major championships before finally winning one, this loss was the first. He won two majors in 1941 at The Masters and U.S. Open.

This was the first playoff at the Open in a dozen years, since 1921, also won by an American at St Andrews;  was born in Scotland but became a U.S. citizen the previous year.

The Old Course was par 73 in 1933; the #17 Road Hole was a par-5 through the 1946 Open.

Card of the course

^ The 10th hole was posthumously named for Bobby Jones in 1972

Past champions in the field

Made the cut  

Source:

Missed the cut 

Source:

Herd, age 65, fell during the first round and twisted an ankle.

Did not advance past qualifying rounds (Monday & Tuesday):
Arnaud Massy (1907) 163, James Braid (1901, 1905, 1906, 1908, 1910) 168,Harry Vardon (1896, 1898, 1899, 1903, 1911, 1914) 175, Ted Ray (1912).

Did not enter:
 Tommy Armour (1931), Bobby Jones (1926, 1927, 1930), Jim Barnes (1925), Jock Hutchison (1921).

Round summaries

First round
Wednesday, 5 July 1933

Source:

Second round
Thursday, 6 July 1933

Source:

Third round
Friday, 7 July 1933 (morning)

Source:

Final round
Friday, 7 July 1933 (afternoon)

Source:
Amateurs: McLean (+6), Tolley (+6), Somerville (+12), Dunlap (+14), Jamieson (+18)

Playoff
Saturday, 8 July 1933

Scorecards

Morning round

Afternoon round

Source:

References

External links
St Andrews 1933 (Official site)

The Open Championship
Golf tournaments in Scotland
Open Championship
Open Championship
Open Championship